The scale-free ideal gas (SFIG) is a physical model assuming a collection of non-interacting elements with a stochastic proportional growth. It is the  scale-invariant version of an ideal gas. Some cases of city-population, electoral results and cites to scientific journals can be approximately considered scale-free ideal gases.

In a one-dimensional discrete model with size-parameter k, where k1 and kM are the minimum and maximum allowed sizes respectively, and v = dk/dt is the growth, the bulk probability density function F(k, v) of a scale-free ideal gas follows

 

The entropy equation of state is

 

This expression has the same form as the one-dimensional ideal gas, changing the thermodynamical variables (N, V, T) by (N, Ω,σw).

Zipf's law may emerge in the external limits of the density since it is a special regime of scale-free ideal gases.

References 

Information theory
Thermodynamics
Scale-invariant systems